The shorthead conger (Bathycongrus macrurus) is an eel in the family Congridae (conger/garden eels). It was described by Charles Henry Gilbert in 1891, originally under the genus Ophisoma. It is a marine, deep water-dwelling eel which is known from the Gulf of California to Panama, in the eastern central Pacific Ocean. It dwells at a depth range of 265–590 metres. Males can reach a maximum total length of 25 centimetres.

References

Bathycongrus
Fish described in 1891